Nikolas Rose is a British sociologist and social theorist.  He is Distinguished Honorary Professor at the Research School of Social Sciences, in the College of Arts and Social Sciences at the Australian National University and Honorary Professor at the Institute of Advanced Studies at University College London. From January 2012 to until his retirement in April 2021 he was Professor of Sociology in the Department of Global Health and Social Medicine (previously Social Science, Health & Medicine) at King's College London, having joined King's to found this new Department.  He was the Co-Founder and Co-Director of King's ESRC Centre for Society and Mental Health. Before moving to King's College London, he was the James Martin White Professor of Sociology at the London School of Economics, director and founder of LSE's BIOS Centre for the Study of Bioscience, Biomedicine, Biotechnology and Society from 2002 to 2011, and Head of the LSE Department of Sociology (2002–2006). He was previously Professor of Sociology at Goldsmiths, University of London, where he was Head of the Department of Sociology, Pro-Warden for Research and Head of the Goldsmiths Centre for Urban and Community Research and Director of a major evaluation of urban regeneration in South East London.  He is a Fellow of the British Academy, the Royal Society of Arts and the Academy of Social Sciences, and a Fellow of the Royal Danish Academy of Science and Letters.  He holds honorary doctorates from the University of Sussex, England, and Aarhus University, Denmark.

Biography
Originally trained as a biologist, Nikolas Rose has done extensive research on the history and sociology of psychiatry, on mental health policy and risk, and on the social implications of recent developments in psychopharmacology. He has also published widely on the genealogy of subjectivity, on the history of empirical thought in sociology, and on changing rationalities of political power. He is particularly known for his development of the work of the French historian and philosopher Michel Foucault for the analysis of the politics of our present, and stimulating the revival of studies of governmentality in the Anglo-American world. His own approach to these issues was set out in his 1999 book Powers of Freedom: Reframing Political Thought.

His first book, The Psychological Complex, published in 1985, pioneered a new way of understanding the social history and implications of the discipline of psychology.  This was followed in 1996 by Inventing Our Selves: Psychology, Power and Personhood and in1989 by Governing the Soul: the shaping of the private self  .  These three books are widely recognised as founding texts in a new way of understanding and analysing the links between expertise, subjectivity and political power. Rose argues that the proliferation of the 'psy' disciplines has been intrinsically linked with transformations in governmentality, in the rationalities and technologies of political power in 'advanced and liberal democracies'. (See also governmentality for a description of Rose's development of Foucault's concepts).

In 1989, he founded the History of the Present Research Network, an international network of researchers whose work was influenced by the writings of Michel FoucaultTogether with Paul Rabinow, he edited the Fourth Volume of Michel Foucault's Essential Works.

In November 2001, he was listed by The Guardian newspaper as one of the top five UK based social scientists, on the basis of a twenty-year analysis of citations to research papers, and the most cited UK based sociologist.

For six years he was managing editor of the journal Economy & Society, one of the UK's leading interdisciplinary journal of social science, and he is  a founder and co-editor of BioSocieties: An interdisciplinary journal for social studies of life sciences.

In 2007 he was awarded an ESRC Professorial Research Fellowship – a three-year project entitled 'Brain, Self and Society in the 21st Century'. In 2013, writing with Joelle Abi-Rached, he published  Neuro: the new brain sciences and the management of the mind.  He has long advocated for 'revitalizing' the social and human sciences through a 'critical friendship' with the life sciences, setting out the nature and implications of his 'cartography of the present' in a number of widely cited papers and in The Politics of Life Itself, published in 2007.

Throughout his academic career he has been a critical analyst of psychiatry.  His first book on this topic, The Power of Psychiatry, a collection edited together with Peter Miller  was published in1986. His most recent book Our Psychiatric Future: the politics of mental health was published by Polity Press in October 2018. His recent work has been on the social shaping of mental distress and its biopolitical implications: his  book The Urban Brain: Mental Health in the Vital City, written with Des Fitzgerald, was published by Princeton University Press in 2022.

Nikolas Rose has led many international collaborative research projects, including BIONET, a major collaboration of European and Chinese researchers on the ethical governance of biomedical research in China.  He is the Chair of the Neuroscience and Society Network, an international network to encourage critical collaboration between social scientists and neuroscientists, which was funded for several years by the European Science Foundation.

He also served for several years as a member of the Royal Society's Science Policy Committee. He was Co-Director of the first publicly funded UK centre dedicated to synthetic biology based at Imperial College. where he led a team examining the social, ethical, legal and political dimensions of this emerging field. At King's he led a team of researchers exploring the social implications of new developments in biotechnology, and committed to the democratisation of scientific research and technological development, with a particular focus on synthetic biology and neurobiology. For many years he was a member of the Social and Ethical Division of the Human Brain Project, where he led the Foresight Lab based at King's College London which aimed to identify and evaluate the potential impact of the new knowledge and technologies produced by the Human Brain Project in neuroscience, neurology, computing and robotics, and also examined such issues as artificial intelligence and the political, security, intelligence and military uses of novel brain technologies.

His work has been translated into many languages including Swedish, Danish, Finnish, German, Italian, French, Hungarian, Korean, Russian, Chinese, Japanese, Romanian, Portuguese and Spanish.

Selected publications

Books
 The Urban Brain: Mental Health in the Vital City, with Des Fitzgerald (Princeton University Press, in press, 2022)
Our Psychiatric Future: the politics of mental health, (Polity, 2018)
 Neuro: The New Brain Sciences and the Management of the Mind, with Joelle M. Abi-Rached (Princeton University Press, 2013)
 Governing the Present: Administering Economic, Social and Personal Life, with Peter Miller (Polity, 2008)
 The Politics of Life Itself: Biomedicine, Power, and Subjectivity in the Twenty-First Century, (PUP, 2007)
 Powers of Freedom: Reframing Political Thought (Cambridge University Press, 1999)
 Inventing Our Selves: Psychology, Power and Personhood (Cambridge University Press, 1996)
 Governing the Soul: The Shaping of the Private Self (Routledge, 1989, Second edition, Free Associations, 1999)
 The Psychological Complex: Psychology, Politics and Society in England, 1869–1939 (Routledge, 1985)

Chapters in edited collections (selected)
'Writing the History of the Present', in Jonathan Joseph, ed., Social Theory: A Reader. Edinburgh: Edinburgh University Press, 2005 (with Andrew Barry and Thomas Osborne) (Reprint of selections from Introduction to Foucault and Political Reason, 1996.)
'Biological Citizenship', in Aihwa Ong and Stephen Collier, eds., Global Assemblages: Technology, Politics and Ethics as Anthropological Problems, pp. 439–463. Oxford: Blackwell, 2005 (with Carlos Novas)
Introduction to The Essential Foucault: Selections from Essential Works of Foucault, 1954–1984, New York: New Press, 2004 (with Paul Rabinow)
'Becoming Neurochemical Selves', in Nico Stehr, ed., Biotechnology, Commerce and Civil Society, Transaction Press, 2004
'The neurochemical self and its anomalies', in R. Ericson, ed., Risk and Morality, pp. 407–437. University of Toronto Press, 2003.
'Power and psychological techniques', in Y. Bates and R. House, eds., Ethically Challenged Professions, pp. 27–46. Ross-on-Wye:  PCCS Books, 2003.
'Society, madness, and control', in A. Buchanan, ed., The Care of the Mentally Disordered Offender in the Community, pp. 3–25, Oxford: Oxford University Press (2001)
'At Risk of Madness', in T. Baker and J. Simon, eds., Embracing Risk: The Changing Culture of Insurance and Responsibility, pp. 209–237, Chicago: University of Chicago Press (2001)

Papers in refereed journals (selected)
'Towards neuroecosociality: mental health in adversity', Theory, Culture and Society, 2021: https://doi.org/10.1177%2F0263276420981614
'Revitalizing sociology: urban life and mental illness between history and the present', British Journal of Sociology, 67, 1, 138-160 (With Des Fitzgerald and Ilina Singh)
'Still like 'birds on the wire'', Economy and Society, 2017, 46, 3-4, 303-323
Reading the Human Brain How the Mind Became Legible', Body and Society, 2016, 22 ,2, 140-177: doi:10.1177/1357034X15623363
'Spatial Phenomenotechnics: Making space with Charles Booth and Patrick Geddes', Environment and Planning D: Society and Space, 2004, 22: 209–228 (with Thomas Osborne).
'Neurochemical selves', Society, November/December 2003, 41, 1, 46–59.
'Kontroll', Fronesis, 2003, Nr. 14-15, 82–101.
'The politics of life itself', Theory, Culture and Society (2001), 18(6): 1–30.
'Genetic risk and the birth of the somatic individual', Economy and Society, Special Issue on configurations of risk (2000), 29 (4): 484–513. (with Carlos Novas).
'The biology of culpability: pathological identities in a biological culture', Theoretical Criminology (2000), 4, 1, 5–34.

Notes

External links
Nikolas Rose Personal Website
Brain, Self and Society project
Department of Global Health and Social Medicine

1947 births
Living people
British sociologists
Academics of the London School of Economics
Academics of King's College London
Foucault scholars
Synthetic biologists